Oganov is a masculine surname of Armenian origin, its feminine counterpart is Oganova. Notable people with the surname include:

Artem R. Oganov (born 1975), Russian-American chemist, physicist, and materials scientist
Victor Oganov (born 1976), Russian boxer